Agatha, Stop That Murdering! (German: Agatha, laß das Morden sein!) is a 1960 West German comedy crime film directed by Dietrich Haugk and starring Johanna von Koczian, Klausjürgen Wussow and Elisabeth Flickenschildt. It is a parody both of the ongoing film series of Edgar Wallace adaptations but also the traditions of the mystery novels of Agatha Christie.

The film's sets were designed by the art directors Franz Bi and Bruno Monden. It was shot at the Bavaria Studios in Munich.

Plot
A famous female crime novelist goes to stay in a country house, where a killer is on the loose.

Cast
Johanna von Koczian as Agatha Scott 
Klausjürgen Wussow as Dr. Peter Brent 
Elisabeth Flickenschildt as Sylvia Brent, his aunt 
Peter Vogel as Edgar Karter 
Hans Dieter Zeidler as David
Wolfgang Kieling as Philip 
Karl Lieffen as Thomas Lorenzen 
Beppo Brem as Landgendarm 
Egon Vogel as institutional physician 
Paul Bös as coffin seller
Gudrun Thielemann as secretary

References

External links

1960s crime comedy films
German crime comedy films
West German films
Films directed by Dietrich Haugk
German parody films
Constantin Film films
Films shot at Bavaria Studios
Films set in England
1960s German-language films
1960s German films